Pierre Hanon (29 December 1936 in Brussels – 13 October 2017) was a footballer who played mainly for R.S.C. Anderlecht and the national team.  He played in the match Belgium-Netherlands in 1964 with 10 fellows from the Anderlecht team after the substitution of goalkeeper Delhasse by Jean-Marie Trappeniers. In total, Hanon collected 48 caps.

Hanon signed to Anderlecht in 1945 as a young player.  He was first called in the first team in 1954 but he lost his place after a poor performance.  A season later, he played in the 2–0 victory to rivals Standard Liège, but was sent to the B team again for the rest of the competition.  His third match with the team was in Hungary for the first European game in Anderlecht history.  Hanon was called by the manager the day of the match because of Susse Deglas's injury, while he was doing his military service.  So he left the barracks without eating to join the team, and though made a good match.

Used as a right winger, Hanon became a libero at the end of his Anderlecht career, and then at Cercle Brugge.

References
 Biography
 Cerclemuseum.be

1936 births
2017 deaths
Belgian footballers
Belgium international footballers
Association football midfielders
R.S.C. Anderlecht players
Cercle Brugge K.S.V. players
R.A.E.C. Mons players
Belgian Pro League players
Footballers from Brussels